Batlava-Donja Penduha Airfield or Batlava Airport  (Albanian: Aeroporti i Batllavës; Serbian: Аеродром Батлава / Aerodrom Batlava) is a former military airport in the village of Dumosh, near Lake Batlava and the towns of Batlava and Podujevo in Kosovo.

History
In 1936, Aeroput used the airport on the Belgrade-Podujevo-Skopje line using the Aeroput MMS-3 plane. The airport was later rebuilt for military use by the Yugoslav army and air force. It was damaged in 1999 during the NATO bombing of the Federal Republic of Yugoslavia.

See also 

List of airports in Kosovo
Dumosh

Annotations

Sources
  Airfield: Donja Penduha

External links
  DONJA PENDUHA AIRFIELD, SERBIA

Airports in Kosovo
Yugoslav Air Force bases